The shoelace formula, shoelace algorithm, or shoelace method (also known as Gauss's area formula and the surveyor's formula) is a mathematical algorithm to determine the area of a simple polygon whose vertices are described by their Cartesian coordinates in the plane. It is called the shoelace formula because of the constant cross-multiplying for the coordinates making up the polygon, like threading shoelaces. It has applications in surveying and forestry, among other areas.

The formula was described by Albrecht Ludwig Friedrich Meister (1724–1788) in 1769 and is based on the trapezoid formula which was described by Carl Friedrich Gauss and C.G.J. Jacobi. The triangle form of the area formula can be considered to be a special case of Green's theorem.

The area formula can also be applied to self-overlapping polygons since the meaning of area is still clear even though self-overlapping polygons are not generally simple. Furthermore, a self-overlapping polygon can have multiple "interpretations" but the Shoelace formula can be used to show that the polygon's area is the same regardless of the interpretation.

The polygon area formulas 

Given: A  planar simple polygon with a positively oriented (counter clock wise) sequence of points  in a Cartesian coordinate system. 
For the simplicity of the formulas below it is convenient to set .

The formulas:
The area of the given polygon can be expressed by a variety of formulas, which are connected by simple operations (see below):
If the polygon is negatively oriented, then the result  of the formulas is negative. In any case  is the sought area of the polygon.

Trapezoid formula 

Triangle formula 
The triangle formula sums up the oriented areas  of triangles :

Shoelace formula 

The determinant formulas are the base of the popular shoelace formula, which is a scheme, that optimizes the calculation of the sum of the 2×2-Determinants by hand:

Other formulas 

A particularly concise statement of the formula can be given in terms of the exterior algebra. If  are the 
consecutive vertices of the polygon (regarded as vectors in 
the Cartesian plane) then

Example 
For the area of the pentagon with

one gets 

The advantage of the shoelace form: Only 6 columns have to be written for calculating the 5 determinants with 10 columns.

Deriving the formulas

Trapezoid formula 

The edge  determines the trapezoid  with its oriented area

In case of  the number  is negative, otherwise positive or  if . In the diagram the orientation  of an edge is shown by an arrow. The color shows the sign of : red means , green indicates . In the first case the trapezoid is called negative in the second case positive. The negative trapezoids delete those parts of positive trapezoids, which are outside the polygon. In case of a convex polygon (in the diagram the upper example) this is obvious: The polygon area is the sum of the areas of the positive trapezoids (green edges) minus the  areas of the negative trapezoids (red edges). In the non convex case one has to consider the situation more 
carefully (see diagram). In any case the result is

Triangle form, determinant form 

Eliminating the brackets and using 

Because one half of the i-th determinant is the oriented area of the triangle  this version of the area formula is called triangle form.

Other formulas 

Combining both sums and excluding  leads to 

With the identity  one gets

Alternatively, this is a special case of Green's theorem with one function set to 0 and the other set to x, such that the area is the integral of xdy along the boundary.

Manipulations of a polygon 

From the triangle form of the area formula or the diagram below one observes for :

In case of  one should first shift the indices.

Hence:
Moving  affects only  and leaves  unchanged.

Example: 

With the above notation of the shoelace scheme one gets for the oriented area of the 
blue polygon: 
green triangle:   
red triangle: 
blue polygon minus point : 
blue polygon plus point  between : 
One checks, that the following equations hold:

Generalization 

In higher dimensions the area of a polygon can be calculated from its vertices using the exterior algebra form of the Shoelace formula (e.g. in 3d, the sum of successive cross products):(when the vertices are not coplanar this computes the vector area enclosed by the loop, i.e. the projected area or "shadow" in the plane in which it is greatest).

This formulation can also be generalized to calculate the volume of an n-dimensional polytope from the coordinates of its vertices, or more accurately, from its hypersurface mesh. For example, the volume of a 3-dimensional polyhedron can be found by triangulating its surface mesh and summing the signed volumes of the tetrahedra formed by each surface triangle and the origin:where the sum is over the faces and care has to be taken to order the vertices consistently (all clockwise or anticlockwise viewed from outside the polyhedron). Alternatively, an expression in terms of the face areas and surface normals may be derived using the divergence theorem (see Polyhedron § Volume).

See also
Planimeter
Polygon area
Pick's theorem
Heron's formula

External links 

 Mathologer video about Gauss' shoelace formula

References

Area
Geometric algorithms
Surveying